Song Puxuan (born March 1954) is a retired general of the Chinese People's Liberation Army (PLA). He served as director of the Logistic Support Department of the Central Military Commission from 2017 to 2019. Prior to that, he served as commander of the Northern Theater Command, commander of the Beijing Military Region, deputy commander of the Nanjing Military Region, president of the PLA National Defence University.

Biography
Song Puxuan was born in March 1954 in Boxing County, Shandong Province. He joined the PLA in 1969, and served in the Jinan Military Region for decades. He later rose to become a division commander in the 67th Group Army, chief of staff of the 54th Group Army, and deputy chief of staff of the Jinan Military Region. He has a bachelor's degree from the PLA National Defence University and a graduate degree in Marxist philosophy from Shandong University.

Song attained the rank of major general in 2002. In 2006, he succeeded  as commander of the elite 54th Group Army, which is nicknamed the "Iron Army". In 2008, the 54th Group Army participated in the relief efforts of the Great Sichuan earthquake under his leadership.

In 2009, Song was promoted to deputy commander of the Nanjing Military Region, succeeding lieutenant general , who had retired. He attained the rank of lieutenant general in 2010. In July 2013, Song was appointed president of the PLA National Defence University, replacing Wang Xibin. In December 2014, he replaced lieutenant general Zhang Shibo as commander of the Beijing Military Region, while Zhang took over Song's old position as president of the PLA National Defence University. It was considered an extraordinary move by paramount leader Xi Jinping, as Song is not a member of the 18th Central Committee, while most past commanders of the key Beijing MR, including Zhang Shibo, had been Central Committee members.

On 31 July 2015, Song Puxuan was promoted to general (shangjiang), the highest rank for Chinese military officers in active service.

Song was the chief commander of the 2015 China Victory Day Parade marking the 70th anniversary of the victory over Japan. On February 1, 2016, he was named commander of the re-organized Northern Theater Command.

References

1954 births
Living people
People's Liberation Army generals from Shandong
Shandong University alumni
PLA National Defence University alumni
Presidents of the PLA National Defence University
Commanders of the Beijing Military Region
Deputy commanders of the Nanjing Military Region
Commanders of Northern Theater Command